Jeremy Laster (born February 24, 1974) is an American water polo player. He competed in the men's tournament at the 1996 Summer Olympics.

References

External links
 

1974 births
Living people
American male water polo players
Olympic water polo players of the United States
Water polo players at the 1996 Summer Olympics
Sportspeople from Fullerton, California
Pan American Games gold medalists for the United States
Water polo players at the 1995 Pan American Games
Pan American Games medalists in water polo
Medalists at the 1995 Pan American Games